Gaoming Sports Centre Stadium (Simplified Chinese: 高明体育中心体育场) was a multi-use stadium in Gaoming District, Foshan, China.  It was used mostly for football matches and was used for the 2015 Chinese Women's FA Super Cup Final and 2016 Chinese FA Cup qualifying rounds. The stadium had a capacity of 8,000 people.

References 

Defunct football venues in China
Buildings and structures in Foshan
Sports venues in Guangdong